The St Kilda house mouse (Mus musculus muralis) is an extinct subspecies of the house mouse found only on the islands of the St Kilda archipelago of northwest Scotland. They were first described, alongside the St Kilda field mouse, by natural historian Gerald Edwin Hamilton Barrett-Hamilton in 1899.

Origin
It is uncertain when they first arrived on the islands, but it is possible that they were unwittingly transported there during the Norse period. Isolated on the islands, the St Kilda house mouse diverged from its relatives. It became larger than the mainland varieties, although it had a number of traits in common with a subspecies found on Mykines in the Faroe Islands, Mus musculus mykinessiensis.

Extinction
When the last St Kildans were evacuated in 1930, the endemic house mouse became extinct very quickly, as it was associated strictly with human settlement. Some specimens exist in museums. The St Kilda field mouse (Apodemus sylvaticus hirtensis), a subspecies of the wood mouse, is still present.

References

Sources
Harrisson, T. H. and J. A. Moy-Thomas. 1933.  "The Mice of St Kilda, with Especial Reference to Their Prospects of Extinction and Present Status". Journal of Animal Ecology, 2: 109–115.
Musser, G. G. and M. D. Carleton. 2005. "Superfamily Muroidea". pp. 894–1531 in Mammal Species of the World a Taxonomic and Geographic Reference. D. E. Wilson and D. M. Reeder eds. Johns Hopkins University Press, Baltimore.

External links
St Kilda Mice and Wrens

Mus (rodent)
Rodent extinctions since 1500
Extinct mammals of Europe
Extinct animals in the United Kingdom
Rodents of Europe
Endemic fauna of Scotland
Fauna of St Kilda, Scotland
Endemic biota of the Scottish islands
Mammals described in 1899
Taxa named by Gerald Edwin Hamilton Barrett-Hamilton
Extinct rodents